Ibrayevo (İbray) is a rural locality (a village) in Baydavletovsky Selsoviet, Zianchurinsky District, Bashkortostan, Russia. The population was 479 as of 2010. There are 4 streets.

Geography 
Ibrayevo is located 39 km northeast of Isyangulovo (the district's administrative centre) by road. Sazala is the nearest rural locality.

References 

Rural localities in Zianchurinsky District